Aulonemia clarkiae is a species of bamboo of the genus Aulonemia. It is commonly found in Mexico.
The species is part of the grass family and is endemic to Latin America.

References

clarkiae